Chandola is a Brahmin surname of Garhwali and Kumaoni origin mostly used in the Indian state of Uttarakhand.

Chandolas in Kumaon Region
Chandolas in Kumaon region live in several villages in Bageshwar district. Their major villages are Pokhri at Kanda near Vijaypur and Kafligair. Their ist devata is Dhauli Nag, the main temple being 1 km from Vijaypur. A yearly mela/bhandara is organized in the temple premises. Badri Datt Pandey mentions that some of them are probably descendants of Mishra Brahmins, who came from Garhwal and settled in Kumaon during the reign of Rudra Chand (1568–1597).

Chandolas in Garhwal Region
In Garhwal region Chandolas live in District Pauri Garhwal, Chamoli Garhwal, Dehradun.

Notable people with surname Chandola
People with surname Chandola who may or may not belong to the specific Brahmin caste.

 Anoop Chandola -  American linguist and anthropologist
 Jyotsna Chandola - Indian actress

See also 
 Garhwali people
 Kumauni people
 Chandola Lake

References 

Surnames
Indian surnames
Surnames of Indian origin
Surnames of Hindustani origin
Hindu surnames
Brahmin communities of Uttarakhand